The Naoriya Phulo script, also known as the Naoria script or the Invented Meitei Yelhou Mayek script or the Invented Meetei Yelhou Mayek script, is a constructed script, invented by Laininghan Naoriya Phulo (1888-1941), to write Meitei language (officially called Manipuri language). It is different from the Meitei Mayek, the official script for Meitei language. It shares many similarities with the Devanagari script and the Eastern Nagari script (Bengali-Assamese script).

History 
The invented script of Naoriya Phulo of Cachar was sometimes interpreted as a divine gift. According to a legend, it was presented to him in his trance along with a text named the "Shakok Salai Thiren" (written in this script). During the 1930s, using his own invented script, Naoriya Phulo challenged the then official script for Meitei language.
Naoriya Phulo and his organization named "Apokpa Marup" used to claim the newly invented script as the original old script for Meitei language. However, the claim was later discarded.
In the year 1973, they demanded their invented script to be adopted as the "Meitei script".

Comparison to other scripts 

According to some scholars like Wahengbam Ibohal, the invented script of Naoriya Phulo seems to be a modified version of Devanagari script, using some letters of the generally approved Meitei script and Bengali script. There was no proper evidence of that script being used in any certain periods of history.

Vowels

See also 
 List of constructed scripts
 Naoriya Pakhanglakpa Assembly constituency
 Naoriya Pakhanglakpa

Notes

References

External links 

Abugida writing systems
Constructed scripts
Meitei language